John Boynton may refer to:

 John F. Boynton (1811–1890), early leader in the Latter Day Saint movement and American geologist and inventor
 John Keyworth Boynton (1918–2007), British legal officer
 John Boynton (Worcester Polytechnic Institute) (1791–1868), American tinware entrepreneur and founder of Worcester Polytechnic Institute